Timeline of Washington may refer to:

 Timeline of Washington (state)
 Timeline of Washington, D.C.